Marray may refer to:

 Marray, Indre-et-Loire, a commune in central France
 Jonathan Marray (born 1981), tennis player
 Santosh Marray, bishop of the Episcopal Diocese of Easton in Maryland, United States

See also 
 Murray (disambiguation)